Herbert Finnigan (birth registered fourth ¼ 1889 – ) was an English professional rugby league footballer who played in the 1910s.

Background
Herbert Finnigan's birth was registered in Wakefield district, West Riding of Yorkshire, England, he was killed aged  during World War I, and he was the first Wakefield Trinity player to be killed.

References

External links
Search for "Finnigan" at rugbyleagueproject.org

1889 births
1915 deaths
British military personnel killed in World War I
English rugby league players
Rugby league players from Wakefield
Place of death missing
Rugby league centres
Rugby league wingers
Wakefield Trinity players